Vypolzovo is a rural locality (a village) in Denyatinskoye Rural Settlement, Melenkovsky District, Vladimir Oblast, Russia. The population was 9 as of 2010.

Geography 
Vypolzovo is located on the Kartyn River, 33 km northeast of Melenki (the district's administrative centre) by road. Novo-Barsukovo is the nearest rural locality.

References 

Rural localities in Melenkovsky District